is a Japanese actress and singer who has performed in television shows, movies, and commercials. She is managed by Stardust Promotion.

Biography

Acting career

Shibasaki debuted in 2000, when she portrayed Mitsuko Souma in Battle Royale. Shibasaki also won critical acclaim for her role as Tsubaki Sakurai in the 2001 film Go, which earned her several awards, including the Best Supporting Actress Award of Japanese Academy, the Hōchi Movie Award, and the Kinema Junpō Award.

In 2013, Shibasaki made her U.S. film debut in 47 Ronin, a Keanu Reeves-led adaptation of the Chushingura story of samurai loyalty and revenge. The film was billed as the first ever English-language adaptation of the legend, based on historical events in the early 18th century. 

In 2017, she played the main character Ii Naotora in the NHK Taiga drama TV series Naotora: The Lady Warlord. Before the series was filmed, Shibasaki visited the grave of Naotora.

Music career

Shibasaki has two musical groups: Koh+ (with Masaharu Fukuyama) and Galaxias! (with Deco*27 and TeddyLoid).

Shibasaki made her debut in the music industry in 2002 with her first single, "Trust My Feelings", but she became recognized for her second single, "Tsuki no Shizuku", which was used for the movie Yomigaeri.

Although she does not compose her own music, Kō Shibasaki writes the lyrics for most of her songs. Many of her singles have become theme songs for various films, dramas, and commercials. Her single "Lover Soul" was the ending theme song for the live action drama Otomen.

Her song "Another World" was the soundtrack of "Mirai Nikki - Another:World" (2011).

In June 2015, Shibasaki released her first cover album Kou Utau, and in June 2016, she released her second cover album Zoku Kou Utau.

Filmography

Film

Television

Dubbing 
Cruella, Cruella de Vil (Emma Stone)
The Matrix Resurrections, Gwyn de Vere (Christina Ricci)

Discography 
Shibasaki has sold over 4 million singles combined.

Studio albums

Compilation albums

Extended plays

Singles

 "×" denotes periods where charts did not exist or were not archived.

DVDs 
 Kō Shibasaki Single Clips  (2004)
 Kō Shibasaki Invitation Live (2007)
 Live Tour 2008 -1st- DVD (2008)

Awards

Movies
 For her role in the 2001 movie Go:

 For her role in the 2005 movie House of Himiko:

Others

References

External links
  
 Ko Shibasaki at Oricon 
 

1981 births
Living people
Actresses from Tokyo
Japanese actresses
Japanese film actresses
Japanese television actresses
Japanese women pop singers
People from Tokyo
Singers from Tokyo
Stardust Promotion artists
Taiga drama lead actors
Universal Music Japan artists
20th-century Japanese actresses
21st-century Japanese actresses
21st-century Japanese women singers